Mark Savage may refer to:

 Mark Savage (Australian film director) (born 1962), Australian film and television screenwriter and film director
 Mark Savage (American playwright), American playwright, songwriter, and theatre director
 Mark Savage (Hollyoaks), "Dodger" Savage, television character
 Mark Savage, BBC music correspondent